George Gao (born 1967) is a Chinese-born erhu player and composer.

History 
Gao was born in 1967, in Shanghai, China. He began studying the erhu at the age of six. In 1982, he won First Prize at the Shanghai Junior Instrumental Soloist Competition and a Silver Medal at the China National Junior Instrumental Soloist Contest. His performance skill exempted him from high school exit exams, and he entered the Shanghai Conservatory of Music. During his stay, he participated in a program to broadcast Chinese language radio from North America. He finished his Bachelor of Arts degree, and graduated in 1988 with honors. He was the first student ever promoted one year early from that school. After graduation, he was invited to the International Orchestra as a solo artist. He founded the pop bands Red Maple Leaf and Snowman in Beijing. In 1989, he was invited to North Korea to host the World Youth Festival and the Arts diploma.

In 1991, he was admitted into The Royal Conservatory of Music and began studying piano and vocals. He also established the Inner Pulse pop band during that year. Two years later, he became the first erhu instructor at the school, established the first erhu syllabus, and organized the first large erhu concert in Canada. In 2005, he was invited to play at the Governor-General's inauguration in Ottawa.
He tours the world frequently, performing in entertainment centers such as the United States, Canada, France, Japan, and China.Gao has performed with multiple orchestras as a soloist, including the Toronto Symphony Orchestra, National Arts Centre Orchestra, Edmonton Symphony Orchestra, Georgian Bay Symphony and I Musici de Montréal Chamber Orchestra. His most notable work is on the soundtrack of the television series Earth: Final Conflict. He has also performed with the Canada-based violin group Bowfire.

Gao is still the erhu instructor at the Royal Conservatory of Music. He lives in Toronto, Ontario, Canada with his wife, Jenny Zhang(张海京). He is also the inventor of the shaoqin (韶琴); and erhu with a wider range and specifically used in concert settings.

Notable awards 
 1982: 
 First Prize, Shanghai Junior Instrumental Soloist Competition
 Silver Medal, China National Junior Instrumental Soloist Contest
 1985: 
 First Prize, Beijing China National Invitational Erhu Competition 
 Two Best Performance Prizes in two categories
 1999: Recognition Award, 13th World Festival for Young Students. (North Korea)
 2005: Gemini Award nomination, Best Performance in a TV series. (Canada)

Composition credits

Films 
Gao has composed soundtrack music for feature and documentary films, including:
 Becoming American: The Chinese Experience, three-part PBS documentary, Bill Moyers Productions/Tom Lennon Documentary Group
 Yellow Wedding
 Chinese Chocolate

Original compositions 
 Capriccio for Erhu
 Song of a traveler
 After the rain
 Birds in a foreign land
 Heaven on Earth

Adaptations 
Gao transposed many pieces into concert works for the erhu. Many of his adaptations successfully convey the same virtuosity displayed in the original versions, while adapting for the erhu, an instrument not accustomed to Western classical music. For example, one of the disadvantages the erhu has is only two strings, as opposed to the four-stringed violin. The player must reach an extended amount of notes on a single string to make up for this difference.
 Pablo Sarasate – Carmen Fantasy, Zigeunerweisen
 Massenet – Meditation from Thais
 Saint-Saëns – The Swan
 Bach – Gounod Avi Maria
 Paganini – Moto perpetuo
 And others.

References

External links 
 Official Site
  George Gao's Erhu World – his personal blog. 
 Faculty List at Royal Conservatory of Music

Chinese male composers
Living people
Erhu players
1967 births
Musicians from Shanghai
Shanghai Conservatory of Music alumni
The Royal Conservatory of Music alumni
Academic staff of The Royal Conservatory of Music
Educators from Shanghai